Benjamin Guild (1749-1792) was a bookseller in Boston, Massachusetts, in the late 18th century. He ran the "Boston Book Store" and a circulating subscription library in the 1780s and 1790s at no.59 Cornhill, "first door south of the Old-Brick Meeting-House."

Biography
Born in 1749 to Benjamin Guild and Abigail Graves, Benjamin attended Harvard College (class of 1769); classmates included Theophilus Parsons, Alexander Scammel, Peter Thacher, William Tudor, and Peleg Wadsworth. He later tutored at Harvard, 1776-1780, and travelled abroad. In 1784 he married Betsey Quincy (1757-1825). He served as a charter member and an officer of the American Academy of Arts and Sciences, and on the editorial committee of the Boston Magazine.

Guild sold books from his shop at no.8 State Street from around 1785 until 1786, when he moved to Cornhill (1786-1792). In addition to the bookshop, he ran a circulating library, one of the first in post-war Boston. The library contained "several thousands" of volumes, which, according to its 1787 newspaper advertisement "will furnish such a fund of amusement and information as cannot fail to entertain every class of readers ... whether solitary or social -- political or professional -- serious or gay." Subscribers paid eight dollars per year, or "two dollars per quarter -- to have the liberty of taking out two books at a time and no more -- to change them as often as the subscriber pleases -- and no book to be retained longer than one month." Guild stipulated that "any book lost, abused, leaves folded down, writ upon or torn, must be paid for." After his death in 1792, Guild's bookshop and library were taken over by William P. Blake.

Among the titles in Guild's circulating library in 1789:

 Addison's Works
 Algerine Spy in Pennsylvania
 Robert Bage's Barham Downs, a novel
 Countess de Genlis' Adelaide and Theodore
 Madame de Lafayette's Zayde, a Spanish History
 Raynal's Revolution in America
 John Rice's Art of Reading
 Robin's New Travels in America
 Baron de Tott's memoirs of the Turkish Empire
 Nathaniel Wanley's Wonders
 Wraxall's Tour
 Wyld's Practical Surveyor
 Wynne's History of America
 Yorrick's Sentimental Journey
 Zimmerman's Political Survey of Europe

See also
 List of booksellers in Boston

Notes

References

Bibliography

External links

 

1749 births
1792 deaths
Businesspeople from Boston
18th century in Boston
Bookstores in Boston
Libraries in Financial District, Boston
American booksellers
Financial District, Boston
Fellows of the American Academy of Arts and Sciences
Harvard College alumni